James Bateman may refer to:
James Bateman (horticulturist) (1811–1897), British landowner and horticulturist
James Bateman (artist) (1893–1959), English painter of rural scenes
James Bateman (MP), MP for Carlisle
James Bateman (banker) (c. 1660–1718), English merchant, Lord Mayor of London and Governor of the Bank of England
Jamie Bateman (born 1954), Canadian former professional ice hockey
Henry Gibson (1935–2009), American actor and comedian, born James Bateman

See also
Bateman (disambiguation)